Wednesday Night Hockey may refer to:

Canada
Wednesday Night Hockey (2002–2004), on TSN Hockey
Wednesday Night Hockey (2014–present), on NHL on Sportsnet

United States
Wednesday Night Hockey (1992–2004), on the NHL on ESPN
Wednesday Night Hockey (NBCSN) (2013–2021), on the NHL on NBCSN
Wednesday Night Hockey (2021–present), on the NHL on TNT